The UWA World Women's Championship (Campeonato Mundial Feminil de UWA in Spanish) was a singles women's professional wrestling championship promoted by the Mexican Lucha Libre wrestling based promotion Universal Wrestling Association (UWA) from 1975 until the UWA closed in 1995 and since then defended on the Mexican independent circuit.  Zuleyma was the reigning champion when UWA closed and she sporadically defended the title over the next 10 years, often with over a year between title defenses. The last champion was Miss Janeth with no recorded title defenses after 2003.

As it was a professional wrestling championship, the championship was not won not by actual competition, but by a scripted ending to a match determined by the bookers and match makers. On occasion the promotion declares a championship vacant, which means there is no champion at that point in time. This can either be due to a storyline, or real life issues such as a champion suffering an injury being unable to defend the championship, or leaving the company.

Title history

Footnotes

References

Universal Wrestling Association championships
World professional wrestling championships
Women's professional wrestling championships